Neaetha irreperta is  a jumping spider species in the genus Neaetha that lives in Tanzania. It was first described 2000.

References

Fauna of Tanzania
Spiders described in 2000
Spiders of Africa
Salticidae
Taxa named by Wanda Wesołowska